Pallet is a Public Benefit Corporation working to end unsheltered homelessness and give people a fair chance at employment. The Washington based organization designs and produces rapid deployment shelters. The transitional shelter villages help bridge the gap from living on the street to finding permanent housing. Pallet responds to emergencies and housing needs with solutions built fast and at scale and shelters can also support communities facing disaster situations. From private shelters with lockable doors to on-site bathrooms, village residents have peace of mind, and each shelter can be assembled in an hour.

Products 
The Pallet shelters are made from aluminum and composite panels, which makes them easy to clean and assemble.  They are designed to rapidly address unsheltered populations with a resource net of on-site social services, as well as food, showers, laundry, and more to help people transition to permanent housing. Pallet structures are also designed to rapidly address the housing and resource needs of disaster survivors. 

Pallet shelters are a flexible system that can be installed on a wide variety of surfaces and connected to a number of power sources and standard sewer service lines.

The shelters come in a variety of sizes and configurations: 

 Shelter 64- Designed and built with the right balance of efficiency and comfort, the Shelter 64 is the industry-standard rapid-response sleeping shelter. Optimized for one or two people. Climate-control options and a locking door provide residents comfortable, secure, and dignified shelter.
 Shelter 100- This 100 square foot shelter is a versatile structure with options for sleeping up to four people or can be configured as a village services office. Families, couples, or individuals can live with peace of mind and comfort with features such as a smoke detector, climate control, and lockable door.
 Community 400 & 800- Pallet’s larger community structures provide a safe and comfortable space for residents to meet for meals, meetings, social gatherings, and work.
 Two-Stall Hygiene- Based on the Shelter 100, the hygiene structure provides a private, lockable space with flushable toilet, a sink, and a shower in each of its two rooms. Easy to install, clean, and maintain, the Two-Stall Hygiene unit is an essential part of a dignified shelter community.
 Accessible Hygiene & Half Bath- The same features as the standard unit with the added benefit of an additional half bath.
 Laundry- Built on the Shelter 100 platform with the ability to house four full-size washers and dryers. The layout features a folding table, wash sink, lighting, and climate control. The Pallet Laundry unit is a plug-and-play solution.

All Pallet structures are built by their team of fair chance workforce who have lived experience. By utilizing aerospace construction methodology and materials, each shelter is lightweight, strong, and durable.

T6061 aircraft grade aluminum cross sections serve as a structural frame that allows the shelters to be rated to handle wind speeds of up to 110 mph and endure snow loads of 25 lbs. per square foot. The HD structural frame can withstand wind speeds of up to 170 mph and endure snow loads of 50 lbs. per square foot.

With a rigid outer skin and a lightweight foam interior, the custom engineered panels provide incredible strength and insulation properties in a lightweight package. Offered in 0.5” and 1.5” thickness, they are easy to clean and maintain so energy is focused on residents and community, not village upkeep.

Pallet shelters are designed to meet or exceed industry guidelines. Local authorities inspect them before residents move in. Each shelter is equipped with smoke/carbon monoxide detectors, interior and exterior lighting, and ample electrical outlets.  An on-site service provider also ensures resident safety.

In 2022 Pallet officially launched its Dignity Standards that they will partner on with site operators, cities, and governments to ensure all Pallet villages give residents the support services necessary to break the cycle of homelessness. The standards ensure basic needs are met in the continuum of care by providing amenities like hygiene facilities, meals, transportation, safety, and other supportive services.

Pallet's dignity standards are guided by the company's experience building nearly 100 villages across the U.S., employees with lived experience, and feedback from site operators and residents. While these standards have already been part of Pallet's agreements with local municipalities, they have not been declared officially until now.

Uses 
Pallet shelters have been used as part of transitional housing and supportive housing programs, and for homeless people who are recovering from surgery or illness. Pallet villages have been supportive of many homeless communities including but not limited to veterans, the formally incarcerated, indigenous communities and residents who need support for themselves as well as their pets.

A village, complete with individual shelters and separate support buildings, can be designed and built in a matter of weeks.  Separate buildings may be used to provide food, case managers, security, and rehabilitation services.

As of 2022, villages using Pallet's tiny homes have been built in about 100+ communities in California, Minnesota, Hawaii, New Jersey, Vermont and Washington. Some agencies have reported that up to half of the residents have subsequently obtained permanent housing.

Company 
Pallet invests in people and is a fair chance employer. More than half of their employees have experienced homelessness, substance use disorder, and/or the criminal justice system. They’ve found stability through meaningful employment. 

The company was founded in 2016.  The manufacturing facility is in Everett, Washington.

References 

Housing in the United States